Nüst is a river of Hesse, Germany. It flows into the Haune near Hünfeld.

See also
List of rivers of Hesse

References

Rivers of Hesse
Rivers of Germany